Pier Street is a street in the central business district of Perth, Western Australia. It runs from St Georges Terrace to Wellington Street, continuing immediately north of the railway until Brisbane Street very close to where Brisbane Street meets Bulwer Street.

The street originally continued north as far as Perth Oval. The crossing with the Armadale/Thornlie railway line (just north of Wellington Street) was a site of regular accidents before it was closed.

In the 1840s, before the northern part of Perth Water was filled in to become what is now the Supreme Court Gardens, Pier Street extended south past St Georges Terrace as far as the Swan River.

In the 1930s the northern portion, on the northern side of the railway passing through Perth, had a range of notable businesses located in the blocks between the railway and Newcastle Street.  J. & E. Ledger was one such firm.

Hay Street intersection
The intersection with Hay Street was where the Swan River Mechanics' Institute series of buildings were located on the south west corner.
 1851 (Mechanics Hall on the front of building) - 1898
 1901 name changed to Perth Literary Institute
 1957 became the City of Perth Library (which moved to Council House, Perth in 1963)

Pier Street defines the eastern border of the city block known as Cathedral Square.

The Playhouse Theatre was located in Pier Street.

St Georges Terrace intersection
The Deanery is located on the corner of Pier Street and St Georges Terrace.

References

 
Cathedral Square, Perth
Streets in Perth central business district, Western Australia